Rego Center is a shopping mall bordered by the Long Island Expressway, Junction Boulevard, Queens Boulevard, 63rd Drive, and 99th Street in the Rego Park neighborhood of Queens in New York City.

History
The property was originally the only Queens location of Alexander's, a New York City department store. Caldor had bought up the location and was in the processes of opening their store in the fall of 1995 but those plans were stalled when the chain filed for bankruptcy that year. Sears later opened in 1996.

Retailers also include Bed Bath and Beyond, Marshalls, Old Navy and Burlington Coat Factory in Phase I. An Aldi supermarket also opened on level 1 in February 2011. The nearest competitor malls are Queens Center and Queens Place Mall.

, Vornado Realty Trust, the mall's owner, is developing a 24-story, 314-unit residential tower named The Alexander on top of the mall's phase II, due to a surge in young professionals moving into the area. About 20% of the units are studio apartments, with the rest being one- and two-bedroom apartments.

On January 4, 2017, it was announced that Sears would be closing as part of a plan to close 150 stores nationwide. The store closed in April 2017. A year later, in March 2018, Toys "R" Us announced that it would close all of its US stores, including the location at Rego Center. The site was then occupied by a toy store called Toy City, operated by Party City.

On January 13, 2019, Kohl's announced that its store at Rego Center would be closing along with 3 other stores nationwide. The store closed on April 13, 2019.

In September 2019, IKEA announced plans to convert the former Sears into its third New York City location. It opened on January 11, 2021. However, on October 26, 2022, it was announced that IKEA would be closing this location on December 3.

On April 24, 2020, it was announced that At Home would be opening in the former Kohl's space in 2021.

On September 10, 2020, it was announced that Century 21 would be closing its location as part of a plan to close all 38 stores nationwide. One month later, Century 21 permanently closed its Rego Park store.

Withdrawals
The Home Depot withdrew from the rental deal with Vornado in late 2008 due to drop in profit.  The space vacated by Home Depot was replaced by Costco. This is Costco's fifth location in New York City and second in Queens.

In 2005, Walmart had been dropped as a potential tenant, as an early part of its bid to open a store within New York City. Opposition by various groups killed the plan.

In October 2022, it was announced that IKEA would be closing its Rego Center location.

Layout
The following layout of retail space is taken from Vornado's Property website.
 Level 3: Lenora Furniture, T.J. Maxx, Bed Bath and Beyond, Old Navy, Burlington Coat Factory
 Level 2: Marshalls
 Street Level: Dallas BBQ, T-Mobile, Mandee, The Vitamin Shoppe, Aldi, Subway, Panera Bread, Marshalls
 Lower Level: Costco

References

External links
 
 
 Rego Park Center
 Department of City Planning Resolution 27 July 2005 
 PlanNYC-Rego Park II
 PlanNYC-Archival Search for Rego Park Mall II
 Rego Center details at Vornado Realty Trust website
 Ehrenkrantz Eckstut & Kuhn Architects project profile page

Shopping malls in New York City
Shopping malls established in 2010
Tourist attractions in Queens, New York
Commercial buildings in Queens, New York
2010 establishments in New York City